Asisat Lamina Oshoala MON (born 9 October 1994) is a Nigerian professional footballer who plays as a striker for Spanish Liga F club FC Barcelona and the Nigeria women's national team. Widely regarded as one of the greatest African female footballers of all time and one of the best in the world, she is one of the most celebrated African female footballers of all time, and she won African Women's Footballer of the Year a record five times.

Asisat previously played for English clubs Arsenal and Liverpool, Chinese club Dailan, and Nigerian clubs 
Rivers Angels and FC Robo. She won the 2015 FA Women's Cup with Arsenal; two league championships and a cup title with Dalian; and the 2019–20 Copa de la Reina and 2019–20 Supercopa de España Femenina with Barcelona. She was the first African (and Nigerian) player to score a goal in a UEFA Women's Champions League final and has helped Barcelona reach the semi-finals three consecutive years, and one final. On 16 May 2021, Asisat became the first African woman to win the UEFA Champions League, after Barcelona defeated Chelsea 4–0 in the finals. The following season, she became the first African woman to win the Primera División's Pichichi Trophy, and in August 2022 became the first African woman nominated to the Ballon d'Or.

Asisat was the highest goal scorer at the 2014 FIFA U-20 Women's World Cup and was named  best player at the tournament. She was also named best player and second top goalscorer with the Super Falcons team who won the 2014 African Women's Championship.

In September 2014, Oshoala was made a Member of the Order of the Niger by President of Nigeria Goodluck Jonathan. In 2021, she was named in the Forbes 30 Under 30. She is popularly called “Àgba Baller”, which means in her local palance, “Legendary Footballer”.

Club career

Liverpool: 2015–2016 
On 23 January 2015, Oshoala joined Liverpool in England's Women's Super League. The club's manager, Matt Beard, called her "one of the best young players in the world". Although rumours had linked her with other clubs, she was very happy to join Liverpool. She was the first player from an African nation to compete in the top women's league in England.

Despite missing two months of the 2015 season with a knee injury, Oshoala scored three goals in the nine games in which she played as defending champions Liverpool finished in seventh place.  Her first goal of the season was the game-opener of a 2–1 win against Birmingham City on April 1. During the club's 2–1 win over Manchester City, she scored the game-opening goal in the tenth minute. She scored the club's third goal of a 3–1 win against Arsenal on 12 July.

In January 2016, Liverpool reported that a transfer bid from Arsenal had activated the release clause in Oshoala's contract and that she was discussing personal terms with the London club.

Arsenal: 2016–2017 
In March 2016, Oshoala signed with Arsenal. Arsenal manager, Pedro Losa said of her signing, "Asisat is a fantastic talent and will be a great addition to our squad. She is quick, with excellent feet and has proven she can score goals so it's very positive she has decided to join us."

Oshoala helped Arsenal win the 2016 FA Women's Cup Final on 14 May. The win marked the club's 14th title. Oshoala made 13 appearances for the club during the 2016 season and scored two goals. She scored the game-winning goal in the 2–0 win against Notts County on 28 August. Arsenal finished in third place with a  record.

Dalian Quanjian: 2017–2019 
On 10 February 2017, Oshoala signed with Chinese club Dailan (大连女子足球俱乐部).  During the 2017 season, she scored 12 goals helping Dalian Quanjian win the league championship. She was awarded the league's Golden Boot award for most goals scored. The same year, she scored four goals during the 2017 Women's Super Cup and helped the club defeat Shanghai 5–3 to win the championship. In October 2018, she helped the club win the league championship for the second consecutive year.

FC Barcelona: 2019–present 
On 31 January 2019, Spanish club FC Barcelona Femení signed Oshoala on a loan deal until the end of the season.  On May 31, 2019, Barcelona announced her full transfer to the club and extension until 2022. She scored seven goals in her seven appearances for the club during the 2018-19 season. Barcelona finished in second place during the regular season with a  record.

Oshoala scored Barcelona's only goal in a 4–1 defeat to Lyon in the 2019 UEFA Women's Champions League Final. She was the first African (and Nigerian) to score in a Champions League Final.

During the 2019-20 season, Oshoala scored 20 goals in her 19 appearances for Barcelona. She scored her first goals of the season with a brace against Atlético Madrid on 19 September 2019. In October, she scored another brace against Madrid lifting Barcelona to a 4–0 win. On January 11, 2020, Oshoala scored four goals in a 6–0 win against CD Tacon. Barcelona finished in first place during the regular season with an undefeated  record. Oshoala's 20 goals ranked second in the league following teammate Jenni Hermoso with 23.

Oshoala scored the game-opening goal in the fourth minute of the 2019–20 Copa de la Reina semi-finals against Sevilla. She provided assists on two the goals to lift Barcelona to a 6–0 win. Barcelona defeated Logroño 3–0 to clinch the championship.

On 21 August 2020, Oshoala provided the assist for Kheira Hamraoui's game-winning goal in the 2019–20 UEFA Women's Champions League quarter-final against Atlético Madrid lifting Barcelona to the semi-final.

On 24 March 2021, Oshoala scored the game-winning goal in the team's 3–0 win over Manchester City during the first leg of the 2020–21 UEFA Women's Champions League quarterfinals. On 16 May 2021, Oshoala became the first African woman to win the UEFA Champions League, after coming on in the 71st minute of the finals with  Barcelona defeating Chelsea 4–0.

On 10 March 2022, Oshoala signed a two-year contract extension that would keep her at Barcelona until 30 June 2024.

Style of play
Oshoala found success as a forward for Nigeria's youth teams but made most of her early appearances for the senior national team as an attacking midfielder. She was nicknamed "Seedorf" after male footballer Clarence Seedorf and has also been referred to as "Superzee" by her teammates.

International career
Oshoala's club coach Edwin Okon was serving as the national team interim manager when he gave her a debut senior cap in a friendly defeat by world champions Japan in September 2013.

Oshoala was named as the best player at the 2014 FIFA U-20 Women's World Cup and was the top goalscorer at the tournament with seven goals. She was also named best player and second top goalscorer with the Super Falcons team who won the 2014 African Women's Championship. She also won the BBC Women's Footballer of the Year 2015.  In September 2014, Oshoala was made a Member of the Order of the Niger by President of Nigeria Goodluck Jonathan.

On 8 June 2015, Oshoala scored her first 2015 FIFA Women's World Cup goal when she scored the team's second goal in a 3–3 draw with Sweden in Winnipeg. After the team was defeated 2–0 by Australia and 1–0 by the United States, they did not advance to the knockout stages.

Oshoala was also a member of the Super Falcons team who won the African Women's Championship in 2016 and 2018. She scored three goals in the 2018 Edition in Ghana.

Oshoala vice-captained the Super Falcons at the 2019 FIFA Women's World Cup in France. During the team's second group stage match against South Korea, she scored in the 75th minute lifting Nigeria to a 2–0 win. Oshoala was named Player of the Match. Her goal was nominated for Goal of the Tournament by FIFA. Nigeria finished third in Group A and advanced to the knockout stages where they faced two-time champions Germany and were defeated 3–0 in a controversial match heavily influenced by video assistant referee (VAR).

International goals

Honours
Rivers Angels
 Nigerian Women's Championship: 2014
 Nigerian Women's Cup: 2013, 2014

Arsenal 
 FA Women's Cup: 2015–16

Dalian Quanjian F.C. 
 Chinese Women's Super League: 2017 2018

FC Barcelona
 Primera División: 2019–20, 2020–21, 2021–22
 UEFA Women's Champions League: 2020–21; 
 Supercopa de España Femenina: 2019–20, 2021–22, 2022–23
 Copa de la Reina: 2019–20, 2020–21, 2021–22
Nigeria
African Women's Championship: 2014, 2016, 2018
FIFA U-20 Women's World Cup runner-up: 2014
Individual
 BBC Women's Footballer of the Year: 2015
Queen of The Pitch Award: 2014
African Women's Footballer of the Year: 2014, 2016, 2017, 2019, 2022
African Women's Youth Player of the Year: 2014
African Women's Championship Golden Ball: 2014
African Women's Championship Golden Boot: 2016
FIFA U-20 Women's World Cup Golden Boot: 2014
FIFA U-20 Women's World Cup Golden Ball: 2014
Primera División Top scorer: 2021–22
Chinese Women's Super League Top scorer: 2017
IFFHS CAF Best Woman Player of the Decade 2011–2020
IFFHS All-time Africa Women's Dream Team: awarded 2021
IFFHS CAF Woman Team of the Decade 2011–2020
 EaglesTracker Nigeria Women's Most Valuable Player of the Season: 2020–21

Other work
Oshoala launched the Asisat Oshoala Foundation in 2019 focused on empowering girl footballers in Africa. The foundation hosts the annual Asisat Oshoala Foundation Football4girls tournament in Lagos. She is a NIKE Ambassador. In 2021, she was named to Forbes 30 Under 30. In October 2021, she was appointed unto FIFA's technical advisory group on the growth and advancement of women's football. The grouped is headed by Jill Ellis and has fellow African Doreen Nabwire also as a member.

Personal life
Oshoala recounts that her parents were not supportive when she dropped out of school to pursue a football career. She is a Muslim.

See also
 List of Nigeria women's international footballers
 List of Africa Women Cup of Nations hat-tricks
 List of Nike sponsorships
 List of Yoruba people

References

External links

  
 Asisat Oshoala at FC Barcelona
 Asisat Oshoala at Arsenal Women
 Asisat Oshoala at BDFutbol
 
 
 
 

1994 births
Living people
Sportspeople from Lagos
Rivers Angels F.C. players
Nigeria women's international footballers
Liverpool F.C. Women players
Arsenal W.F.C. players
Nigerian Muslims
Women's association football forwards
Yoruba sportswomen
Women's Super League players
Nigerian women's footballers
2015 FIFA Women's World Cup players
Dalian Quanjian F.C. players
Chinese Women's Super League players
2019 FIFA Women's World Cup players
FC Barcelona Femení players
Primera División (women) players
Nigerian expatriate women's footballers
Nigerian expatriate sportspeople in England
Expatriate women's footballers in England
Nigerian expatriate sportspeople in China
Expatriate women's footballers in China
Nigerian expatriate sportspeople in Spain
Expatriate women's footballers in Spain
FC Robo players
African Women's Footballer of the Year winners